Hello Arsi is a 2018 Indian Odia romantic drama film written and directed by Sambit Mohanty, and produced by Ajaya Routray. The film stars Partha Sarathi Ray and Prakruti Mishra. The film background score was composed by sound designer Subash Sahu, and its soundtrack was composed by Mitrabhanu Mohanty. Critics praised the screenplay, story, and the acting of lead actress Prakruti Mishra. Director Sambit Mohanty, who died shortly after filming, posthumously won a Rajat Kamal award for Best Screenplay (Dialogue).

At the 65th National Film Awards, the film won  Best Feature Film in Odia, Best Screenplay, and Special Mention awards.

Plot
The film tells the story of a girl named Arsi from Rourkela, India, who becomes a sex worker to survive. It explores topics of social alienation and industrialization, focusing more on ideas and actions rather than the characters.

The film begins and ends in a car. The male protagonist remains unnamed for the duration of the film.

Cast
 Prakruti Mishra as Arsi
 Partha Sarathi Ray as Taxi Driver

Production
The film began shooting in early 2017 in Rourkela, India.

Awards

References 

Cinema of Odisha
2018 films
National Film Award (India) winners